Eleven ships of the Royal Navy have borne the name HMS Unity or HMS Unite:

 was a 32-gun ship, previously the Dutch ship Eendracht.  She was captured in 1665 but was recaptured in 1667.
 was a 4-gun flyboat captured from the Dutch in 1672 and given away that year.
 was a 6-gun fireship purchased in 1688, rebuilt in 1707 as a hoy and sold in 1773.
 was a 4-gun hoy launched in 1693 and sold in 1713.
 was a 4-gun hoy launched in 1693 and sold in 1713.
 was a hoy launched in 1728 and sold in 1788.
 was a store vessel launched in 1788 and broken up in 1878 as YC 3.
HMS Unite was a 40-gun fifth rate captured from the French in 1793. She was on harbour service from 1832 and was broken up in 1858.
 was an  launched in 1913 and sold in 1922.
 was a U-class submarine launched in 1938 and sunk in a collision with SS Atle Jarl in 1940.

See also

Royal Navy ship names